John McNaughton (born January 13, 1950) is an American film and television director, originally from Chicago, Illinois, whose works encompass the horror, thriller, drama and comedy film genres. His films include Henry: Portrait of a Serial Killer (1986), The Borrower (1991), Mad Dog and Glory (1993), Normal Life (1996), Wild Things (1998), Speaking of Sex (2001) and The Harvest (2013).

Career
His first feature film, made in 1986, was Henry: Portrait of a Serial Killer, a film McNaughton directed, co-wrote, and co-produced. Numerous complications plagued the controversial film, delaying its theatrical release until 1989.  The film made Time magazine's and Roger Ebert's ten best lists and won best picture honors at Fantasporto, Sitges Film Festival and the Brussels International Festival of Fantasy Film.

His other works include the films Mad Dog and Glory and Wild Things, the documentary Condo Painting as well as episodes of Homicide: Life on the Street, John From Cincinnati, Masters of Horror and the pilot episode for Push, Nevada.

Personal life
McNaughton studied fine arts at the University of Illinois at Urbana-Champaign, and graduated from Columbia College Chicago with a degree in television production and a minor in photography.

Filmography
 Dealers in Death (1984) 
 Henry: Portrait of a Serial Killer (1986) (also co-writer, with Richard Fire)
 Sex, Drugs, Rock & Roll (1991)
 The Borrower (1991)
 Mad Dog and Glory (1993)
 Girls in Prison (1994) (TV movie)
 Homicide: Life on the Street (1994–1996) (TV series)
 Normal Life (1996)
 Firehouse (1997) (TV movie) (as Alan Smithee)
 Wild Things (1998)
 Lansky (1999) (TV movie)
 Condo Painting (2000)
 Speaking of Sex (2001)
 Push, Nevada (2002) (TV series)
 Expert Witness (2003) (TV series)
 Without a Trace (2003) (TV series)
 Haeckel's Tale (2006) (TV movie in the Masters of Horror anthology series)
 John from Cincinnati (2007) (TV series)
 The Harvest (2013)

References

External links 
 

1950 births
American documentary filmmakers
American film directors
Film producers from Illinois
American male screenwriters
American television directors
Horror film directors
Columbia College Chicago alumni
Living people
Writers from Chicago
Artists from Chicago
Screenwriters from Illinois